The QoS Policy Propagation via BGP, often abbreviated to QPPB, is a mechanism that allows propagation of quality of service (QoS) policy and classification by the sending party based on access lists, community lists, and autonomous system paths in the Border Gateway Protocol (BGP), thus helping to classify based on destination instead of source address.

See also
 Computer network
 Traffic engineering (telecommunications)

External links
 ASR9000/XR: Implementing QOS policy propagation for BGP (QPPB)
 

Internet architecture